Chikmagalur, known officially as Chikkamagaluru, is a city and the headquarters of Chikmagalur district in the Indian state of Karnataka. Located on the foothills of the Mullayanagiri peak of the Western Ghats, the city attracts tourists from around the state for its pleasant and favourable hill station climate, tropical rainforest and coffee estates.

Demographics
As of 2011 Indian Census, Chikmagalur city had a total population of 118,401, of which 58,702 were males and 59,699 were females. Population within the age group of 0 to 6 years was 11,633. The total number of literates in Chikmagalur was 96,359, which constituted 81.4% of the population with male literacy of 83.7% and female literacy of 79.1%. The effective literacy rate of 7+ population of Chikmagalur was 90.3%, of which male literacy rate was 93.1% and female literacy rate was 87.5%. The Scheduled Castes and Scheduled Tribes population was 16,423 and 1,734 respectively. Chikmagalur had 28545 households in 2011.

Transport
Chikmagalur is connected to other parts of the state through roads. State Highway 57 (Karnataka) connects Mysore via Hassan connects Shimoga via Kadur. A railway line connects Chikmagalur to Kadur Junction. The nearest international airport is Mangalore International Airport.

Geography and climate
Chikmagalur is situated in the Malenadu region of Karnataka in the Deccan plateau in the foothills of the Western Ghats. The Yagachi River has its source near the town and flows in the south-easterly direction before uniting with the Hemavati river. Chikmagalur generally has a moderate to cool climate. The temperature of the city varies from 11-20 °C during winter to 25-32 °C during summer.

References

External links 

Chickmagalur City Municipal Council Website

Cities and towns in Chikkamagaluru district
Cities in Karnataka